Jim Tang Wing Kin (born  June 9, 1983, in Hong Kong with family roots in Panyu, Guangdong) is a Hong Kong actor.

Jim was a clown entertainer before he became an actor.  He graduated from 20th TVB Artist Training Course in 2006 and he made his first appearance in The Price of Greed on TVB in 2006.  He had starred in numerous MTVs and played different roles in TVB series. Jim caught the publics attention with his role as Gary in the Best Selling Secrets in 2007.

Filmography

Television
The Price of Greed (2006)
Welcome To The House (2006)
Maidens' Vow (2006)
CIB Files (2006)
A Change of Destiny (2007)
The Drive of Life (2007)
Best Selling Secrets  (2007–2008)
Off Pedder  (2008–2010)
The Threshold of a Persona  (2009)
Man in Charge (2009)
The Beauty of the Game (2009)
The Other Truth (2011)
Forensic Heroes III (2011)
L'Escargot (2012)
The Last Steep Ascent (2012)
Come Home Love: Lo and Behold (2017)

Film
I Love Hong Kong (2011)

External links
 Jim's blog 

1983 births
Living people
People from Panyu District
Hong Kong male film actors
Hong Kong male television actors
TVB actors